Arboleas is a municipality of Almería province, in the autonomous community of Andalusia, Spain.

Found in the Almanzora valley, Arboleas is a small town on the bank of the now dryAlmanzora River, in the spurs of the Sierra de los Filabres.

It has a strong agricultural economy growing citrus, olive trees, almond trees and cereals such as wheat and barley.

Distance to the capital (km): 120
Local Inhabitants: Arboleanos
Number of Inhabitants: 1540
Postal Code: 04660

The village of Arboleas is situated on the riverbank in the Almanzora valley, one of many small settlements along the course of the (now dry) Almanzora river, which once watered the fertile plain. It has a strong agricultural economy, producing citrus fruit, olives, almonds and cereals. Its history can be traced back to prehistoric times, through to the Romans, Moors and Christians, though the origins of the present village are medieval.

Places of interest
Church of Santiago, late 19th century
Torre de Arboleas, possibly a 15th-century watchtower, now a clock
The bridge over the river

Festivals
Santa Ana, 26 July
San Roque, 15 August
Virgen del Pilar, 12 October
Patron Saint festivities, last Sunday in October

References

External links
  Arboleas - Sistema de Información Multiterritorial de Andalucía
  Arboleas  - Diputación Provincial de Almería

Municipalities in the Province of Almería